This article contains a list of productions made by the American animation studio Cartoon Network Studios, a part of Warner Bros. Television Studios division of Warner Bros. and owned by Warner Bros. Discovery. This list includes animated television series, shorts, pilots, specials, and other projects.

Television series

Shorts series

Pilots

Successful

Failed

Other shorts 
This is a list of Cartoon Network Studios/Cartoon Network original shorts that were not pilots.

Feature films and specials

Television releases

Theatrical releases 

 A direct-to-video production.
 An adult animated production.

Notes

References 
Cartoon Network Studios
Lists of animated television series
Cartoon Network-related lists
Warner Bros. Discovery-related lists